The Dixon Branch was an interurban rail line of the Sacramento Northern Railway system, to Dixon in Solano County, California. 

It ran for twelve miles from a point on the main line known as Olcott (or Dixon Junction), that was located in Solano County between Sacramento and Rio Vista Junction.  

The line was built as the Sacramento Valley West Side Electric Railway (SVWSER) in 1914 and commenced operation on January 1, 1915.  It was originally intended by its planner, Melville Dozier, to be operated as Vallejo and Northern and would run up the west side of the Sacramento Vallejo from Dixon Junction, through Dixon and then continue north to Woodland and terminate in Marysville.  Only the track portion from Dixon Junction to Dixon was ever built.

The line was operated by the Oakland, Antioch and Eastern.  The SVWSER only survived a few years due to the interurban only serving the small Dixon community of 1,000 residents.  In August 1917, permission was granted to abandon the line.

See also
Northern Electric Railway-Marysville and Colusa Branch

References

 

Rail lines in California
Interurban railways in California
Sacramento Northern Railway
Transportation in Solano County, California
History of Solano County, California
1915 establishments in California
Railway lines opened in 1915